David William Miller (born 19 August 1942, Watford) is an English philosopher and prominent exponent of critical rationalism. He taught in the Department of Philosophy at the University of Warwick in Coventry, UK. where he is Reader in Philosophy. He has been Honorary Treasurer of the British Society for the Philosophy of Science.

He was educated at Woodbridge School and Peterhouse, Cambridge. In 1964 he began to study Logic and Scientific Method at the London School of Economics. Soon afterwards he became one of Karl Popper's research assistants. In a series of papers in the 1970s, Miller and others uncovered defects in Popper's formal definition of verisimilitude, previously a mostly ignored aspect of Popper's theory. A substantial literature developed in the two decades following, including papers by Miller, to assess the remediability of Popper's approach.

Miller's Critical Rationalism: A Restatement and Defence is an attempt to expound, defend, and extend an approach to scientific knowledge identified with Popper. A central, "not quite original", thesis is that rationality does not depend on good reasons. Rather, it is better off without them, especially as they are unobtainable and unusable.

Books by David Miller

 Croquet and How to Play It with Rupert Thorp, 1966
 Popper Selections, 1985
 Critical Rationalism: A Restatement and Defence, 1994
 Out of Error: Further Essays on Critical Rationalism, 2006

See also 
 William Warren Bartley
 Hans Albert
 Critical rationalism

References

External links
 Probability, Knowledge and Verisimilitude section of Stanford Encyclopedia of Philosophy article

1942 births
20th-century British non-fiction writers
20th-century British philosophers
20th-century essayists
21st-century British non-fiction writers
21st-century British philosophers
21st-century essayists
Academics of the University of Warwick
Alumni of the London School of Economics
British logicians
British male essayists
Critical rationalists
Living people
Philosophers of logic
Philosophers of science
Philosophy academics
Philosophy writers
Popper scholars
People educated at Woodbridge School